Chalceidae, the tucanfishes, is a family of freshwater fish first described by Henry Weed Fowler in the year 1958. It is a monotypic family, home only to the genus incertae sedis Chalceus.

All members of the family inhabit areas of northern South America, including the Amazon River and various tributaries.

Classification 
Chalceidae is in the order Characiformes. The genus Chalceus used to be placed in the family Characidae, and is still listed there by several sources (like GBIF and ITIS). Research since its original placement suggested movement into the family Chalceidae, based upon phylogenetic significance as a monophyletic group. Morphological features further support this move. This was also done in order to keep the family Characidae monophyletic.

Currently, only Chalceus is classified in Chalceidae. Because Chalceus is a genus with five extant species, Chalceidae has five extant species by extension. In alphabetical order, they are:

 Chalceus epakros Zanata & Toledo-Piza, 2004
 Chalceus erythrurus Cope, 1870 (tucan fish)
 Chalceus guaporensis Zanata & Toledo-Piza, 2004
 Chalceus macrolepidotus Cuvier, 1818 (pinktail chalceus)
 Chalceus spilogyros Zanata & Toledo-Piza, 2004

History 

Chalceidae was first described in 1958 by Henry Weed Fowler as Chalceidi. It has also been described as Plethodectidi by the same; this is because Plethodectes erythrurus (Cope, 1870) used to be the sole representative, a name now synonymized with Chalceus erythrurus. Therefore, the family Plethodectidi became defunct alongside the genus Plethodectes (in the context of describing species of Chalceus).

Etymology 
"Tucanfish" directly translates to "toucan fish", because "tucán" means toucan in Spanish. The species C. erythrurus shares a name with the family it belongs to - it is also commonly called the tucan fish.

The sole genus of Chalceidae, Chalceus, gives the family its name and therefore its etymological root. Said root is the Greek word chalkos, which means copper; this is in reference to the original description of C. macrolepidotus, wherein Georges Cuvier reported that its scales were "sometimes golden" when preserved in alcohol.

References 

 
Taxa named by Henry Weed Fowler
Fish described in 1958
Fish of South America
Ray-finned fish families
Monogeneric fish families